Bravo is a rock and roll band founded in 1983 in Moscow, Russia by guitarist Evgeny Havtan.

Biography 

Drawing heavy inspiration from 1950s western music, Bravo was a part of the Soviet rock and roll revival of the 1980s, along with Secret. Their first album was made in 1983.

Despite the fact that at that time rock and roll and beat music (except for The Beatles) were less popular among Soviet citizens than classic rock, the band was one of the most popular underground acts in Russia in the 1980s, until the departure of original lead singer Zhanna Aguzarova (:ru:Жанна Агузарова) in 1988. Since then Bravo has achieved success with several different singers, Valeriy Syutkin (1990-1994) and Robert Lenz (since 1996).

In 2011, after a ten-year break from studio recordings, Bravo released an album Fashion, which received highly positive reviews from critics and good attention from younger audiences. The band recorded the album using vintage instruments from the 50s and 60s. The album was produced by Ghian Wright. The album cover includes a photography of Audrey Hepburn from the US-American romantic comedy Roman Holiday.

Discography

Studio albums 
 Cassette 1983  (1983)
 Cassette 1985  (1985)
 Bravo  (1987)
 Ensemble Bravo  (1987)
 Fops from Moscow  1990
 Moscow Beat  1993
 Road to the Clouds  1994
 The Wind Knows... (single)  1995
 At the Crossroads of Spring  1996
 Serenade 2000 EP  1997
 Hits about Love  1998
 Eugenics  2001
 Fashion  2011
 Forever  2015

Compilations and live albums 
 Zhanna Aguzarova and Bravo  (1993)
 Live in Moscow (1994)
 Songs from Various Years  (1995)
 The Star Catalog (tribute)  (2004)
 30 Years. Concert in Stadium Live  (2014)
 Bravospective  (2017)

References

External links 
 

 Evgeny Havtan's official website

Musical groups from Moscow
Russian rock music groups
Performing groups established in 1983
MTV Europe Music Award winners
1983 establishments in the Soviet Union
Soviet rock music groups